The Opel Calibra is a coupé, engineered and produced by the German automaker Opel between 1989 and 1997. In the United Kingdom, where it remained on sale until 1999, it was marketed under the Vauxhall brand as the Vauxhall Calibra. It was also marketed as the Chevrolet Calibra in South America by Chevrolet, and the Holden Calibra in Australia and New Zealand by Holden.

The Calibra was introduced to belatedly replace the Manta and to counter the Japanese sporting coupés of the period. It employs the running gear of the first generation Opel Vectra, which had been launched in October 1988. Calibra production was based in the Opel factory in Rüsselsheim, Germany, and the Valmet Automotive factory in Uusikaupunki, Finland, where production was consolidated in November 1995. The Calibra was initially only available with front-wheel drive, but from November 1990, four wheel drive became available.

Design 

The Opel Calibra was styled by GM's designer Wayne Cherry, and German designer Erhard Schnell. As a front-wheel drive three door hatchback coupé based on the Vectra A chassis, its ride and handling are not significantly better than that of the large family car from which it grew. Though it had a stiffer chassis as a whole (better torsional rigidity in NM/Deg). The 4WD turbo version of the car, which had independent rear suspension, featured the rear axle of the Omega A with some minor alterations to it. Irmscher suspensions of the sporty limited editions (like DTM, Keke Rosberg, Cliff and Last Edition) also had sharper handling than base models. 

The Vectra A chassis and hatchback rear meant the Calibra was relatively practical compared to many other coupés of this size. It could seat four average-sized passengers (above 175-180 cm only compromised in the rear) and hold 300 liters of luggage. 

An innovative design feature was the slim 7 cm high headlamp, which was possible to create using the then new ellipsoid technology developed in conjunction with Hella. The headlamp design was key to the sport coupé's unique design and aerodynamics.

When launched on 10 June 1989, the Calibra was the most aerodynamic production car in the world, with a drag coefficient (Cd) of 0.26. To reach the record Cd figure, the prototype Calibra had to be taken to the DNW wind tunnel in the Nederlands where models could be tested above a rolling road simulating real life airflow. For the final design smaller alterations were made on the preliminary models: tapering the rear waistline and rear side windows by about 50 mm compared to earlier mockups gave about 0,035 Cd improvement, while another 0,035 improvement was reached by altering panel lines, transition points, integrated front spoiler in front of the tires, engine shield and a panel connecting the fuel tank and the lower edge of the rear bumper. The Calibra remained the most aerodynamic mass production car for the next ten years, until the Honda Insight was launched in November 1999, with a Cd of 0.25.

All later 16V, V6, 4x4 and turbo models had a worse Cd of 0.29, due to changes in cooling system, underbody, use of spoked wheels and glass detail.

Commercial life 
During its lifetime, the Calibra was much more popular in Europe, and outsold its nearest rival, the Ford Probe, which was considered to be underpowered, and very American for most European drivers. Sales of the Vauxhall-badged versions for the UK market commenced in June 1990, with hopes of selling of up to 15,000 examples per year. However, this sales target was never achieved.

In July 1990, after General Motors bought a stake in Saab, it was reported the Calibra would be badged as a Saab in the United States, but these plans did not materialise. There were also plans for a cabriolet version to be produced, but these too failed to materialise.

In the summer of 1994, the Calibra received a light facelift. Most noticeably, the manufacturer badge migrated from its place atop the leading edge of the bonnet into the front grille. Equipment and safety have been developed. Throughout the production run, several special models were launched.

In the United Kingdom, this began with the 'Tickford' conversion in October 1991, however, only 26 Calibras were ever converted. This was followed by Vauxhall's own Special Edition range the SE1 in 1993, and ran through to the SE9 in 1997. These limited run editions had often unique aspects. For example, solar yellow paint on the SE2, or "Icelandic" blue on the SE6. Neither colours were found on any other Calibra in the UK. 

There was also a Keke Rosberg edition first only available in white, in celebration of the Calibra's success in the German Touring Car Championship at the time. In other parts of Europe, special models included the "DTM" edition, the "Cliff" edition, the "Colour" edition, "Last" edition and some special editions only available on certain domestic markets. Some special models sold in continental Europe included lowered Irmscher suspension and a numbered plaque on the ashtray. "DTM" and "Keke Rosberg" featured yellow-gray pattern textile upholstery as standard to remind buyers the colors of Opel DTM racecars. According to different data sources, as well as numbered plaques usually seen on car meets and on the internet the "Keke Rosberg", "DTM", "Cliff" and "Last Edition" cars were produced in relatively low numbers (roughly around a thousand car per edition). 

The last Calibra Turbos were produced in the beginning of 1997, before a final run of Calibra Turbo Limited Editions were rolled out to the UK market. These were all finished in jet black paintwork with Irmscher spoiler, BBS RX 16" alloys and colour coded body fittings. This final incarnation was also lowered by 35mm on Irmscher springs and dampers. The interior was heated cream leather, with a steering wheel trimmed in grey leather and a plaque showing the build number mounted on the centre console.

In continental Europe the Last Edition was the final limited edition offering basically all extras, plenty of colors and full Irmscher set including front bumper, sports suspension and BBS RX 16" alloys. 

The Vectra A was replaced in September 1995, but Calibra production continued until June 1997. Although a smaller coupé (the Tigra) was available, the marque was left without a mid sized coupé until the Astra Coupé was launched in the spring of 2000, and with the introduction of the Opel Speedster two-seater roadster in July 2000, three years after the Calibra was discontinued, Opel finally offered a sports car again. 

There are different data available about production numbers: 238,164 or 238,647 or 239,118 have been built in total. 93,978 have been built in Valmet, Finland. Nearly 130,000 were fitted with 8V, 83,000 with 16V, 14,000 with Turbo and 12,000 with V6 engine. Around 100,000 were sold in Germany, over 40,000 in the UK, more than 27,000 in Italy, over 17,000 in Spain, around 13,000 in France and over 10,000 in Switzerland giving the major markets of the Calibra. Austria, Belgium and the Netherlands contributed 5,000 units apiece. Only a portion of the fleet remain on the roads: in Germany around 5,060 cars, in the UK around 2,250 cars, and in the Netherlands, around 750.

Equipment 
Both standard and optional equipment were considerably developed throughout the production. 

At the beginning of the production the standard equipment of the Calibra 8 valve was a 20W two-speaker stereo with cassetteplayer, sports seats front with adjustable height on the driver's side, split folding rear seats, ABS, power steering, electric side mirror adjustment, analog clock on the middle console, makeup mirrors in the sunvisors, lockable glovebox, tinted windows, 14-inch alloy wheels and bumpers in body color. Features like air-conditioning, electric windows, fog light, board computer and sun roof were optional. 

By contrast better equipped facelifted models with larger engines offered air-conditioning, traction control, electric windows, a 30W 6 speaker stereo system (or 150W Bose with 6 speaker plus additional subwoofer), CD-changer, central locking, immobiliser, leather upholstery with heated front seats, board computer, sunroof, two airbags with pre-tensioners, alarm system with motion sensors, 15 or 16 inch alloy wheels, etc.

Exterior colors 
The Opel Calibra was available in 28 colors throughout the production run, out of which only 9 were black, gray or white. Although only about a half dozen colors were offered simultaneously at certain time periods, meaning colors on the palette were changed quickly. Limited editions usually featured even less color options, than the standard. During the total production period the following colors were available indicated with code, original German and English names and type of lack:

In case of Cliff Motorsport Edition the following color names were applied: Ocean = Magneticblau, Polar = Karibikblau, Barracuda = Keramikblau. Some late Keke Rosberg and DTM models were painted in colors from the standard palette. Colors and special editions offered may be different on certain domestic markets.

Engines 
Power was initially from 2.0 litre 8 valve  C20NE, and a Cosworth designed 16 valve fuel injected  C20XE four cylinder redtop petrol engines.

For 1992, a turbocharged 2.0 litre 16 valve engine  C20LET (turbocharged version of the C20XE) was added to the range. With four wheel drive, a six speed Getrag manual transmission (F28/6) and a claimed top speed of 245 km/h (152 mph).

The Turbo model was also notable for the five stud wheel hubs and the extreme negative camber (inward lean) of its rear wheels.

In 1993, a  2.5 litre V6 (C25XE or SE4) was introduced, available with both manual and automatic transmissions. The V6 was not as fast as the Turbo, but was rather more civilised, and proved to be more reliable than the complex four wheel drive model. 1995 saw the introduction of the X20XEV Ecotec engine, a new version of the classic C20XE 16 valve or "red top" engine.

 2.0 litre 8 valve SOHC I4 –   (all years) (C20NE)
 2.0 litre 16 valve DOHC I4 –   (1990–1995) (C20XE or redtop)
 2.0 litre 16 valve DOHC Ecotec I4 –   (1995–1997) (X20XEV)
 2.0 litre 16 valve DOHC turbocharged I4 –   (1992–1997) (C20LET)
 2.5 litre 24 valve DOHC Ecotec V6 –   (1993–1997) (C25XE from 1994–1996; X25XE in 1997)
The availability of engines is dependent on specific modellvariants, accessory levels and domestic markets.

Technical data

Transmissions 
In addition to the Aisin four-speed automatic transmissions that were available on all models, except the C20LET (although some countries such as Australia did not sell the C20XE with the four-speed auto), there were five manual gearboxes produced by Getrag (all of which were five speed gearboxes, except the six speed F28/6).
 F16CR-5 – Fitted to early 2.0 litre SOHC NA (i.e. C20NE)
 F18CR-5 – Fitted to late 2.0 litre SOHC NA and late 2.0 litre DOHC NA (i.e. C20NE, X20XEV)
 F20 – Fitted to early 2.0 litre DOHC NA (i.e. C20XE)
 F25 – Fitted to 2.5 litre NA (i.e. C25XE, X25XE)
 F28/6 – Fitted to 2.0 litre Turbo (i.e. C20LET)
 AF20 – Fitted to late 2.0 litre SOHC NA and late 2.0 litre DOHC NA (i.e. C20NE, X20XEV) and 2.5 litre NA (i.e. C25XE, X25XE)

The transfer gearbox in the AWD models — the same as used in the Vauxhall Cavalier AWD—was somewhat on the flimsy side, liable to suffer damage from conditions such as minor differences in tyre wear or tyre pressure between front and rear axles. Since front and rear tyres would naturally wear at different rates in normal driving, it was necessary to swap front with rear tyres every  - recent user recommendations propose 3,000 miles (5,000 km).

All four tyres had to be of the same make and model, and all four tyres had to be replaced at the same time — if one tyre was damaged or punctured, the three remaining good tyres also had to be replaced. In addition there were other maintenance requirements which were both exacting and unusual. Neglect of these points through ignorance or a misconceived attempt to save money was common, and was likely to lead to very expensive failures of the transfer gearbox.

Dimensions 

 Length: 4492 mm
 Width (without mirrors): 1688 mm
 Height (empty): 1320 mm
 Wheelbase: 2600 mm
 Track front/rear: 1426/1446 mm
 Tyres: 175/70 R 14 or 195/60 R 14 85 V, 195/60 R 15 or 205/55 R 15 and 205/50 R 16 87 W
 Turning circle: 11,44 m

Safety and Sustainability 
The car got some recycled and recyclable plastics (like headlight frames, water deflector, bumper attachments, inlet manifold, sound insulation) and catalytic converter already at the beginning of the production.

Since the beginning of 1993 all Calibras were delivered with a driver's airbag as standard, and co-driver's full size airbag was added in August. Amongst other small changes during the ongoing development program, other important safety features were added in August 1993: double steel tube strengthening bars in the doors as side crash protection, strengthened door sills, strengthened pillars and roof frame, and seat belt pre-tensioners also became standard for front passengers. Waterbased paint and CFC-free air-conditioning were also reasonable steps taken for sustainability.

Motorsport

Deutsche Tourenwagen Meisterschaft/FIA International Touring Car Championship 

The DTM/ITC-specification race cars used an all-wheel-drive layout, with the engine mounted longitudinally instead of transversely. Early DTM cars used a naturally-aspirated Cosworth-developed 54-degree V6 engine based on General Motors' iron block/aluminium head C25XE.
Due to changes in the Group A Class 1 FIA regulations for 1996, a switch was made to an all-aluminium, 75-degree V6 based on the Isuzu 6VD1 (as used in the Trooper/Amigo). Using this engine, Opel won the 1996 ITC Championship. The Isuzu-based KF V6 was capable of revving to 15,000 rpm. The last known KF V6-powered Calibra race car in existence is the Zakspeed Calibra Concept 2 prototype. The car was built to be used as a test mule for the cancelled 1997 FIA ITC championship.

South African Wesbank Modifieds series 

Wanting a car that would be competitive in the Wesbank Modifieds Series (at the time, South Africa's premier circuit-racing series), South Africa's Delta Motor Corporation commissioned a one-off Calibra race car. Owen Ashley Auto Developments, based in Cape Town, was contracted to design and build the car in late 1990, with financial backing from DMC. The car was designed around the then-current Class A rule set (broadly similar to that used in the American IMSA GT series).
The car was based around an aluminium honeycomb floorpan, to which was secured a chrome-moly steel spaceframe. DMC's brief to Owen Ashley stated that as much of the standard Calibra silhouette as possible  had to be retained. To that end, a standard Calibra roof, side body monocoque pressings, doors and rear window were used. All remaining bodywork was moulded in fibreglass.

The car was powered by a Buick 3800-derived, 3.5-litre all-aluminium odd-fire V6, similar in specification to that used on the IMSA Corvette GTP. Built in the United States by Ryan Falconer, the engine retained its original single-cam, pushrod-and-rocker, two-valves-per-cylinder layout, but employed a Racetronics engine management system and Garrett turbocharger aspirating through a 52mm restrictor plate. The engine produced approximately 600 BHP (447 kW) in race trim. Power was delivered to a rear-mounted five-speed manual Hewland transaxle through a carbon-fibre propeller shaft. Fuel capacity was 40 litres, and double-wishbone suspension was used at both the front and rear ends of the car.

Driven by Michael Briggs, the car was campaigned from 1991 to 1993. A rule change for 1994 that banned turbocharged engines from the series, as well as the rapidly increasing popularity of Group A super touring cars, compelled DMC to retire the Calibra in favour of devoting its motorsport budget and resources to its two-car Astra super touring effort.

Rallying
The Calibra Turbo was also rallied, albeit without notable success. A Calibra finished ninth in the 1992 Sanremo Rallye, with Bruno Thiry at the wheel. This did make it the fastest car in the 1600 to 2000 cc class.

1992 Calibra Cabrio Prototypes 
Although the Coupé shape was so successful, that it was no real demand for a Calibra Cabrio, Valmet Automotive was entrusted by Opel to build fully functioning convertible Calibra prototypes, as competitors also started mid-size convertible development. Valmet Automotive built two red coloured prototypes in 1992, with the 2.0 litre, 8 valve engine. A third body was also produced for use in flexibility tests. With the convertible body, the Calibra lost the practicality of the rear seats and the boot, thus the design was not further developed. Now a red painted prototype is exhibited in the underground garage of Opel Classic at the concept car section.

1997 Calibra B Design Study 
In 1996 Opel began the development of the successor of the Calibra on the basis of the Vectra B, but it didn't fit the international model strategy of General Motors, so the project was dropped. One non-functioning 1:1 scale model from the beginning of 1997 remain, that has been kept hidden for more than twenty years, and revealed for public on the thirtieth anniversary of the Calibra A world premiere. Now the red painted model is exhibited in the underground garage of Opel Classic. As a non-functioning study, it had only a very schematic interior and two different type of headlights (left and right) to test various design solutions at the front.

2007 GTC Concept 
The Opel GTC Concept of March 2007 was linked to the Calibra name, but no production version resulted from the concept car. The GTC concept car was rather a design projection for the first generation of Opel Insignia introduced next year, and especially its most powerful OPC version, which inherited the concept car's large emphasized vertical intakes at the front, similar exhaust tips at the rear and rims on the side. The interior of the first generation Insignia is also very similar to the 2007 GTC Concept. The GTC Concept is showcased in the concept car section of Opel Classic.

References

External links 

Calibra
All-wheel-drive vehicles
Cars introduced in 1989
Sport compact cars
Hatchbacks
Coupés
Front-wheel-drive sports cars
Mid-size cars
Rally cars
Touring cars
1990s cars
Cars discontinued in 1997